Meeanee is a locality south of the city of Napier, in the Hawke's Bay Region on the east coast of New Zealand's North Island. It was named after the Battle of Meeanee in India (now spelled Miani, but the area has retained the older spelling), won by  Sir Charles Napier, the city's namesake. Along with such locations as Clive and Havelock North, it is one of several places within Hawke's Bay to be named after events or people in Colonial India.

History 

Meeanee was the only access inland to Taradale until the road was built in 1873, and was the site of a Catholic  Marist mission station from the 1850s. The priests introduced viticulture to the  Hawke's Bay region, planting several vineyards and establishing the Mission Estate Winery in 1851, New Zealand's oldest surviving winemaking concern. They also built St Mary's Church in 1863, which still stands but is now a privately owned restaurant and event venue.

Economy 

Meeanee is located on the flat coastal plain south of Napier, and surrounded by farmland and apple orchards.

Demographics

Meeanee-Awatoto had a population of 2,541 at the 2018 New Zealand census, an increase of 609 people (31.5%) since the 2013 census, and an increase of 1,047 people (70.1%) since the 2006 census. There were 891 households, comprising 1,293 males and 1,248 females, giving a sex ratio of 1.04 males per female. The median age was 43.7 years (compared with 37.4 years nationally), with 471 people (18.5%) aged under 15 years, 399 (15.7%) aged 15 to 29, 1,221 (48.1%) aged 30 to 64, and 444 (17.5%) aged 65 or older.

Ethnicities were 87.5% European/Pākehā, 14.4% Māori, 3.1% Pacific peoples, 4.5% Asian, and 2.6% other ethnicities. People may identify with more than one ethnicity.

The percentage of people born overseas was 15.0, compared with 27.1% nationally.

Although some people chose not to answer the census's question about religious affiliation, 53.4% had no religion, 35.3% were Christian, 0.8% had Māori religious beliefs, 0.5% were Hindu, 0.1% were Muslim, 0.2% were Buddhist and 2.6% had other religions.

Of those at least 15 years old, 381 (18.4%) people had a bachelor's or higher degree, and 327 (15.8%) people had no formal qualifications. The median income was $37,400, compared with $31,800 nationally. 426 people (20.6%) earned over $70,000 compared to 17.2% nationally. The employment status of those at least 15 was that 1,137 (54.9%) people were employed full-time, 309 (14.9%) were part-time, and 60 (2.9%) were unemployed.

Education 

References 

Suburbs of Napier, New Zealand